The Waterbury Branch is a branch of the Metro-North Railroad's New Haven Line, running north from a junction in the Devon section of Milford to Waterbury, Connecticut. Originally built as the Naugatuck Railroad, it once continued north to Winsted. The part north of Waterbury is now leased from CDOT by the Railroad Museum of New England, which operates excursion trains from Thomaston station through their operating subsidiary Naugatuck Railroad ; this name was chosen in homage of the original railroad. The trackage ends in Torrington, but Metro-North service on the branch ends at Waterbury. There are conceptual plans to extend service from its current terminus in Waterbury to Hartford via Bristol and New Britain. Currently, riders that want to continue to New Britain and Hartford have to transfer to an express bus operated by CTtransit at Waterbury. All trains on this branch operate as shuttles between Waterbury and Bridgeport. The Waterbury Branch currently uses 2 trains to run up and down the branch simultaneously providing 22 daily trips on the branch with large turnaround times sometimes consisting of 90 minutes or more, this will be revised to add additional trains once ridership allows. 

All platforms currently consist of low-level platforms with the exception of the terminal stations being Bridgeport and Waterbury. A new station consisting of a high-level platform at Derby-Shelton is currently awaiting construction while new station plans at Ansonia, Seymour, Beacon Falls, and Naugatuck are currently awaiting designs and funding. 

For most of its route, the branch runs parallel to the Naugatuck River, viewable on the right side northbound and the left side southbound.

History
In 1906, work on double-tracking the branch between Seymour and Waterbury was underway. It was completed in 1907.

In September 2015, it was announced that out of governor Dannel Malloy's 30-year-$100 billion transportation plan, $350 million has been included to improve service along the branch. The upgrades include a new signal system with multiple passing sidings to increase service, newer equipment, and station rehabilitation. Currently, only one train is allowed on the branch at a time. The signalization of the line will allow for multiple trains to safely be on the branch at a time, while allowing for increased capacity and safer train operation. Four passing sidings at Devon, Derby, Beacon Falls, and Waterbury will be built, and they were expected to be completed in 2018. Work began on a siding just north of the Derby–Shelton station and was expected to be completed in late 2015. Some of the 16 grade crossings on the line will be permanently closed, while others will have gates and flashers installed to prevent accidents. The entire project was scheduled to be completed in November 2020 and will cost $73 million.

Centralized Traffic Control was activated on November 7, 2021. Taking advantage of the newly constructed signal system, an increase in service frequency from 15 to 22 trains per day (12 southbound, 10 northbound) was implemented on July 10, 2022 with super express connecting trains from Bridgeport saving commuters up to 60 minutes on their round-trip commute time. More trains are scheduled to come in the cumulative years when ridership yields it.

, the Connecticut Department of Transportation was studying the feasibility of installing catenary wire on the Waterbury Branch.

Stations
The following connecting services are available to Amtrak, Metro-North Railroad, Shore Line East, CTtransit, and Greater Bridgeport Transit Authority.

Rolling stock

The Waterbury Branch uses 2008 Brookville BL20GH and GE Genesis P32AC-DM locomotives and Shoreliner passenger coaches. It has also used Mafersa coaches originally purchased for service on Shore Line East. Prior to the arrival of push-pull coaches, the branch used self-propelled Budd RDC and SPV-2000 railcars, the latter of which were later converted to coaches. A typical shuttle consists of three cars.

See also
Naugatuck Railroad
Connecticut Commuter Rail Council

References

Transportation in New Haven County, Connecticut
Transportation in Fairfield County, Connecticut
Metro-North Railroad
Rail infrastructure in Connecticut
Passenger rail transportation in Connecticut